The Gyeongjeon Line (Gyeongjeonseon) is a railway line serving South Gyeongsang and South Jeolla Provinces in South Korea. It covers a total of 300.6 km, from Samnangjin Station in Miryang, South Gyeongsang, to Gwangju Songjeong Station in Gwangju, South Jeolla.

History

An east-west railway along Korea's southern shore was long seen as a strategic route, but it took a number of attempts to complete the line. The first section of the line was opened as a branch from the newly built Gyeongbu Line at Samnangjin to Masan in May 1905, which was named the Masan Line. A branch from Changwon on the Masan Line to Jinhae, the Jinhae Line, opened on November 11, 1926.

Meanwhile, construction started in the opposite direction from Songjeong-ri (today Gwangju·Songjeong) on the Honam Line, the other end of the future Gyeongjeon Line, with the first  to Gwangju opened in July 1922. The  Gwangju Line was completed to Yeosu on December 25, 1930.

Following the 1961 coup, the Supreme Council for National Reconstruction started South Korea's first five-year plan, which included a construction program to complete the railway network, to foster economic growth. As part of the program, work began on a line to plug the gap between Jinju and Suncheon on April 28, 1962. The Jinju–Suncheon line opened on February 7, 1968, when the whole  railway line from Samnangjin to Songjeong-ri was renamed the Gyeongjeon Line.

Upgrade

The line is being upgraded to an electrified and double-tracked line for 180 km/h in stages, to facilitate regional development. On September 1, 2010, the South Korean government announced a strategic plan to reduce travel times from Seoul to 95% of the country to under 2 hours by 2020. As part of the plan, the entire Gyeongjeon Line is to be further upgraded for 230 km/h.

Samnangjin-Masan-Jinju

The upgraded section will be 101.4 km long. The 41 km section until Masan includes a re-alignment with tunnels closer to Changwon,  the Masan–Jinju section also includes significant re-alignments along the way.

By April 2009, construction progress reached 50.9% of the planned budget of 2,018.782 billion won. The project is implemented as a public-private partnership: the government contribution is 1,680.473 billion won, private capital contributes 338.309 billion won. The Samnangjin-Masan section opened on December 15, 2010. The entire project is foreseen for completion in 2011.

Connected projects

By April 2009, progress was 80.7% out of a total budget of 902.384 billion won. The line was opened and the first freight train travelled the line on December 13, 2010.

A planned new direct connection from Busan will meet up with the realigned Gyeongjeon Line at Jillye. The 32.6 km long double track cutoff is expected to be finished by 2017 with a budget of 1,396.15 billion won. The project is to be implemented with private finance, the preferred bidder for the franchise was selected in July 2010. This line is foreseen for an upgrade to 230 km/h under the government's 2010 plan for 2020.

Jinju-Suncheon

Work started in 2003 on a 56.1 km long section between Jinju and Gwangyang. By March 2010, progress was 19% out of a budget of 1,005.984 billion won. This section includes significant re-alignments with longer tunnels and bridges. The upgrade works also commenced at the junction with the Jeolla Line east of Suncheon. Electrification is to reach Suncheon by 2014.

Additionally, there are plans for a freight branch from Gwangyang to Gwangyang Port.

Suncheon-GwangjuSongjeong

Between Hyocheon and GwangjuSongjeong, to relieve congestion at road crossings in the city, the Gyeongjeon Line got a new alignment bypassing Gwangju to the south. The section of the old alignment between GwangjuSongjeong and Gwangju was upgraded as a  spur line, again called the Gwangju Line, while the  section between Hyocheon and Gwangju, including Namgwangju Station, was torn up. The realignments opened on August 10, 2000.

From Boseong, a new cutoff branch is to connect with the Honam Line at Imseong-ri, just before Mokpo. Construction of the 79.5 km long branch commenced in 2002, however, work was suspended in the middle of the 2000s for lack of funds. As of 2010, the project is on hold after having progressed to 5.5% of the 1,297.924 billion won budget. This branch would include the 5,960 m long Jangdong Tunnel northeast of Jangheung.

The rest of the Suncheon-Gwangju section is foreseen for upgrading in a new alignment under the government's 2010 plan for 2020.

Main stations
In South Gyeongsang:
Samnangjin Station, Miryang, junction with the Gyeongbu Line
Changwon Station, Changwon, terminus of the Jinhae Line
 Masan Station, Masan
Jinju Station, Jinju
Hadong Station, Hadong County

In South Jeolla:
Gwangyang Station, Gwangyang, terminus of the planned Gwangyang Port branch
Suncheon Station, Suncheon, junction with the Jeolla Line
Beolgyo Station, Boseong County
Boseong Station, Boseong County, terminus of a planned line to Mokpo
Gwangju Songjeong Station, Gwangju, junction with the Honam Line and terminus of the Gwangju Line branch to Gwangju station

Defunct stations 
The following stations formerly on the Gyeongjeon Line are now defunct:

 Aengnam Station
 Dorim Station 
 Gaeyang Station 
 Galchon Station 
 Goryak Station 
 Gyowon Station
 Ipgyo Station
 Jinju-sumogwon Station
 Mansu Station
 Naedong Station
 Sanin Station 
 Seokjeong-ri Station 
 Sudeok Station 
Yusu station

Services

The line is served by passenger and freight trains. As of October 2010, from Bujeon station in Busan, cross-country Mugunghwa-ho trains travel in a minimum 1 hour 25 minutes to Masan, 2 hour 55 minutes to Jinju, 4 hours 20 minutes to Suncheon, 6 hours 33 minutes to Gwangju·Songjeong, and 7 hours 34 minutes to Mokpo, while the travel time with transfer from KTX high-speed trains at Miryang is as short as 3 hours 15 minutes.

Gyeongjeon KTX

KTX service from Seoul to Masan started with KTX-II trains on December 15, 2010, with Seoul–Masan travel times between of 2 hours 54 minutes and 2 hours 59 minutes, depending on the stopping pattern.  The service started with 14 daily trains on weekdays and 24 on weekends (Friday to Sunday), with standard class Seoul–Masan tickets costing 47,400 won on weekdays and 50,700 won on weekends. In the first month of service, express bus services between Seoul and Masan or Changwon experienced 30–40% drops in ridership. Korail added an extra pair of Monday morning trains on from January 17, 2011.

After leaving the Gyeongbu High Speed Railway, the Gyeongjeon KTX service stops at the following stations:

The service is to be extended to Jinju by 2012, and may cover the entire line after further upgrades under the government's 2010 plan for 2020.

Branch lines
 Jinhae Line
 Gwangyangjecheol Line
 Gwangyanghang Line
 Gwangju Line
 Singwangyanghang Line
 Busansinhang Line
 Sinhangbuk Line
 Sinhangnam Line
 Deoksan Line
 Jeongyeong Triangular Line

See also
Korail
Transportation in South Korea

References

Railway lines opened in 1905
Railway lines in South Korea
1905 establishments in Korea